Ciliata septentrionalis is a species of fish belonging to the family Lotidae.

It is native to Northwestern Europe.

References

Lotidae
Taxa named by Robert Collett
Fish described in 1875